Atoka Municipal Airport  is a mile north of Atoka, in Atoka County, Oklahoma. The National Plan of Integrated Airport Systems for 2021-2025 categorized it as a general aviation airport.

Most U.S. airports use the same three-letter location identifier for the FAA and IATA, but this airport is AQR to the FAA and has no IATA code.

Facilities
The airport covers 490 acres (198 ha) at an elevation of 590 feet (180 m). Its single runway, 18/36, is 3,015 by 40 feet (919 x 12 m) asphalt. In the year ending July 28, 2009 the airport had 3,500 general aviation aircraft operations, average 291 per month.

References

External links 
 Atoka Municipal Airport (AQR) at Oklahoma Aeronautics Commission
 Aerial image as of March 1995 from USGS The National Map

Airports in Oklahoma
Buildings and structures in Atoka County, Oklahoma